is a former Japanese football player.

Playing career
Akao was born in Yamanashi Prefecture on October 3, 1975. After graduating from Asia University, he joined Japan Football League club Ventforet Kofu in 1998. The club was promoted to new league J2 League from 1999. Although he played many matches as substitute midfielder in 1999, he could hardly play in the match in 2000 and retired end of 2000 season.

Club statistics

References

External links

1975 births
Living people
Asia University (Japan) alumni
Association football people from Yamanashi Prefecture
Japanese footballers
J2 League players
Japan Football League (1992–1998) players
Ventforet Kofu players
Association football midfielders